James E. Mace (February 18, 1952 – May 3, 2004) was an American historian, professor, and researcher of the Holodomor.

Biography
Born in Muscogee, Oklahoma, Mace did his undergraduate studies at the Oklahoma State University, graduating with a B.A. in history in 1973. He pursued his graduate studies at the University of Michigan, where he studied with Roman Szporluk, receiving a Ph.D degree in 1981, with a thesis on national communism in Soviet Ukraine in the 1920s. Starting in July 1981, Mace worked as a postdoctoral fellow at the Harvard Ukrainian Research Institute. Following the advice of Omeljan Pritsak, the director of the Institute, he started doing research for Robert Conquest's book on the Great Famine in Ukraine, The Harvest of Sorrow.

From 1986-90, Mace served as the executive director of the U.S. Commission on the Ukraine Famine, in Washington, D.C. In 1993 he moved from the United States to Ukraine. Since 1995, he was a Professor of Political Science at the National University of Kyiv-Mohyla Academy.

Mace died in Kyiv, aged 52. He is survived by his wife, Natalia Dziubenko-Mace, one son from a previous marriage, William, and two adult stepchildren. The Order of Yaroslav Mudry, 2nd Class was awarded posthumously to Mace by President Viktor Yushchenko, in 2005. A monument in his memory was scheduled to be established in Kyiv in 2008.

Genocide in Ukraine

In his works, he argued that the famine in Soviet Ukraine during the early 1930s was an act of genocide on the part of Soviet leader Joseph Stalin.
In 1982, at the International Conference on the Holocaust and Genocide in Tel Aviv, Mace stated: "In order to centralize the power in the hands of Stalin, what was needed was to destroy the Ukrainian peasant, the Ukrainian intellectuals, the Ukrainian language, Ukrainian understanding of their history and to destroy Ukraine as such. This was simply calculated and primitive: No people, as a result no country, and the result — no problem."

In 1984, Mace designed and directed the Harvard Ukrainian Research Institute's Ukrainian Famine Oral History Pilot Project, which collected 57 oral histories. As director of the US Commission on the Ukraine Famine, Mace directly continued this the Oral History Project, and had 179 oral historical accounts by the time of the publication of the commission's final report in 1988. The Oral History Project was published in 1990.

Over 200 hours of audio recording were handed over to the Ukrainian Parliamentary Library in Kyiv. The tapes of these eyewitness accounts were found scattered over the floor of the library vandalized, some totally destroyed.

Bibliography 
 Mace, James Ernest. Communism and the Dilemmas of National Liberation: National Communism in Soviet Ukraine, 1918—1933 / James Earnest Mace, Harvard Ukrainian Research Institute, Ukrainian Academy of Arts and Sciences in the United States. Cambridge: Distributed by Harvard University Press for the Harvard Ukrainian Research Institute and the Ukrainian Academy of Arts and Sciences in the U.S., 1983. — 334 pp.

See also 
 Robert Conquest — British historian and researcher of the Soviet Union, author of the book The Great Terror.

References

External links

James E. Mace, "Facts and Values: A Personal Intellectual Exploration," in Samuel Totten and Steven Leonard Jacobs (eds.), Pioneers of Genocide Studies (New Brunswick, NJ: Transaction Publishers, 2002), 59-74.
James Mace, a Native American with Ukrainian blood
Findings of the Commission on the Ukraine Famine
James Mace Memorial Panel
Destined to Be A Ukrainian
Famine — Genocide in Ukraine 1932—1933

20th-century American historians
American male non-fiction writers
Historians of Ukraine
Holodomor
Recipients of the Order of Prince Yaroslav the Wise, 2nd class
University of Michigan alumni
University of Oklahoma alumni
Harvard University staff
Academic staff of the National University of Kyiv-Mohyla Academy
Writers from Muskogee, Oklahoma
1952 births
2004 deaths
20th-century American male writers